Perfect All-Kill or PAK is a music chart achievement in South Korea where a song simultaneously reaches number one on the real-time, daily, and weekly components of iChart, a music chart ranking aggregator operated by the South Korean web entertainment publisher Instiz Corporation, the operator of the  web forum. The term "perfect all-kill" was first used when the song "Nagging" by IU featuring Seulong shot up to rank number 1 on all Korean music charts in June 2010. Although Instiz iChart was launched in March 2010, it does not list 2010 records. Aside from "Nagging", "Good Day" by IU, which topped the charts in December 2010, was also recognized as a perfect all-kill song. The artist that holds the record for the most number of songs to achieve a PAK is IU with 21 songs. The song with the most hourly PAKs is "Ditto" by NewJeans with 655 PAKs. "Dynamite" by BTS holds the record for a male group with 610 PAKs. "Celebrity" by IU holds the record for a solo act with 462 PAKs.

iChart

The Instiz iChart is the first and only South Korean online music chart that aggregates the rankings of major music streaming services, including Melon, Genie, Bugs!, Vibe, Flo, and YouTube Music which provide real-time, daily, and weekly data. The iChart has its own real-time and weekly rankings based on points given to songs. The iChart is considered transparent as it calculates scores based on various agencies' ranking data, and updates its real-time and daily charts accordingly. The users can also visit the source agencies’ websites directly to compare rankings. The records may be accessed by the public for three months.

History
Before 2015, the iChart aggregated scores from 10 music service providers. These 10 agencies were Melon, Mnet, Bugs!, Olleh, Soribada, Genie, Naver, Daum, Cyworld, and Monkey3. Each chart provided real-time and daily rankings. The removal and/or replacement of charts from the official iChart ranking list was due to 1) inconsistencies on its ranking criteria; 2) low volume of users; or 3) discontinued service.

In February 2017, Melon, Mnet, and Genie shifted its streaming calculation for real-time charts between 12 PM and 6 PM only. This meant that anything that was released outside that time period will not count towards the chart until 1 PM of the following day. This major change was reported as a measure in pursuit of music charts fairly reflecting a song's popularity.

In May 2017, Olleh and Monkey3 was excluded from Instiz iChart ranking calculation and Naver Music score became doubled.

In February 2019, Flo was added to the iChart.

In October 2019, Mnet discontinued its service and merged with Genie, and was subsequently removed from the chart. Naver Music was also removed, and was replaced by Naver VIBE.

In May 2020, Melon made some changes on its real-time chart ranking calculation. The chart switched from rankings based on hourly usage per song to a chart calculated based on the number of unique listeners. The streams and downloads from the past 24 hours was calculated, rather than the past hour.

Mechanic
The real-time charts are updated during the course of the day, at 30 minutes past each hour. The daily charts, on the other hand, are updated once a day, and each ranking platform updates their charts at different times.

The iChart gathers the data and attributes points to each song. The following table shows the point system that is reflected in the rankings to determine whether the song has achieved a RAK, CAK, or PAK.

On top of these points, the Instiz iChart also attributes bonus points for more popular and widely used platforms than others. It applies a multiplier to the accumulated points that a song gets from certain charts. This multiplier only applies on daily charts.

The following table shows the maximum points for every chart.

Related terms
Other "all-kill" categories on the Instiz iChart include Real-time All-Kill (RAK) and Certified All-Kill (CAK). RAK is achieved when a song becomes number 1 on all iChart real-time charts while CAK is achieved when a song becomes number 1 on all iChart real-time and daily charts. For a song to achieve a PAK, it needs to become number 1 on iChart weekly chart as well.

Achievements

Top 10 songs with the most hourly PAKs
The following table lists the top 10 Korean songs with the highest number of perfect all-kills (in hours), from 2010 to present.

Artists with the most songs to achieve a PAK
The following table lists the top Korean artists with the highest number of songs that achieved a perfect all-kill from 2010 to present.

References

External links
 iChart
 Instiz

South Korean record charts
Music-related lists